George Bradshaw (12 March 1904 – after 1934) was an English professional footballer. He played for Blackpool, Bury and Tranmere Rovers.

Career
Trimdon Grange-born Bradshaw began his career with Blackpool in 1924. In two years with the Seasiders he made 43 Football League appearances. In 1927 he joined Bury, with whom he spent the majority of his career. He made 140 League appearances for the Shakers, scoring the only League goal of his career. In 1935 he signed for Tranmere Rovers. It was with the Wirral club that he finished his career.

References

1904 births
Year of death missing
People from Trimdon Grange
Footballers from County Durham
English footballers
Association football fullbacks
Chilton Colliery Recreation F.C. players
Blackpool F.C. players
Bury F.C. players
Tranmere Rovers F.C. players
English Football League players